The 2003–04 season was the 105th full season of competitive league football in the history of English football club Wolverhampton Wanderers. They played the season in the Premiership, the highest level of English football. This marked their first ever appearance in the modern Premier League, and their first season in the top flight since 1983–84. The club had been promoted after having won the play-off final at the end of the previous season to earn the final promotion spot.

Their return to the top level proved short-lived as the team struggled throughout the campaign and were eventually relegated in 20th place, finishing bottom of the division on goal difference, seven points short of safety. They were officially relegated after failing to win their penultimate game, although their vastly inferior goal difference meant that survival was effectively ruled out on 1 May 2004, despite victory, owing to relegation rivals Manchester City also winning.

Wolves became the third team in Premier League history to fail to win an away game during a season. Contributing to this outcome was a series of serious injuries to key players, with Matt Murray and Joleon Lescott missing almost the entire season and Mark Kennedy and Kenny Miller kept out for long periods.

Results

Pre season
Wolves split their squad into two groups, one led by manager Dave Jones, another by coach Terry Connor after assistant manager John Ward left the club. Preparations also included a week's warm weather training in Jerez, Spain. A planned friendly against Dutch side ADO Den Haag was cancelled on the day of the game after a water leak hit the venue, Telford United's Bucks Head stadium. Only the final friendly was held at Wolves' Molineux home.

FA Premiership

A total of 20 teams competed in the FA Premiership in the 2003–04 season. Each team would play every other team twice, once at their stadium, and once at the opposition's. Three points were awarded to teams for each win, one point per draw, and none for defeats. The provisional fixture list was released on 19 June 2003, but was subject to change in the event of matches being selected for television coverage or police concerns.

Final table

Results summary

Results by round

FA Cup

League Cup

Players

Statistics

|-
|align="left"|||align="left"|||align="left"| 
|21||0||3||0||||0||||0||0||0||
|-
|align="left"|||align="left"|||align="left"| 
|||0||1||0||0||0||||0||5||0||
|-
|align="left"|||align="left"|||align="left"| 
|||0||2||0||||0||||0||7||0||
|-
|align="left"|||align="left"|||align="left"| 
|||5||1||1||||2||||8||10||1||
|-
|align="left"|||align="left"|||align="left"| 
|0||0||0||0||0||0||0||0||0||0||
|-
|align="left"|||align="left"|||align="left"| 
|37||1||2||0||||0||41||1||8||0||
|-
|align="left"|||align="left"|||align="left"| 
|||0||2||0||||0||||0||1||0||
|-
|align="left"|||align="left"|||align="left"|  (c) 
|32||2||1||0||||0||35||2||14||1||
|-
|align="left"|||align="left"|FW||align="left"| 
|||1||0||0||||0||||1||3||0||
|-
|align="left"|10||align="left"|||align="left"| 
|||4||2||0||||0||||4||6||0||
|-
|align="left"|11||align="left"|||align="left"| 
|||2||3||0||||0||||2||1||0||
|-
|align="left"|12||align="left"|||align="left"| 
|||1||||0||||1||style="background:#98FB98"|||2||3||0||
|-
|align="left"|13||align="left"|||align="left"| 
|||0||0||0||||0||||0||0||0||
|-
|align="left"|14||align="left"|||align="left"| 
|||0||||0||||0||style="background:#98FB98"|||0||0||0||
|-
|align="left"|15||align="left"|||align="left"|  ¤
|||0||0||0||0||0||||0||0||0||
|-
|align="left"|16||align="left"|FW||align="left"| 
|||2||3||2||||1||||5||2||0||
|-
|align="left"|17||align="left"|FW||align="left"| 
|||7||0||0||||0||style="background:#98FB98"|||7||3||0||
|-
|align="left"|18||align="left"|FW||align="left"|  
|0||0||0||0||0||0||0||0||0||0||
|-
|align="left"|19||align="left"|FW||align="left"|  
|||4||||0||||0||style="background:#98FB98"|||4||1||0||
|-
|align="left"|20||align="left"|FW||align="left"|  †
|0||0||0||0||0||0||0||0||0||0||
|-
|align="left"|20||align="left"|FW||align="left"| 
|||3||||1||0||0||style="background:#98FB98"|||4||4||0||
|-
|align="left"|21||align="left"|||align="left"|  †
|0||0||0||0||0||0||0||0||0||0||
|-
|align="left"|21||align="left"|||align="left"| 
|16||0||0||0||0||0||16||0||0||0||
|-
|align="left"|22||align="left"|||align="left"| 
|||0||2||0||||0||style="background:#98FB98"|||0||0||0||
|-
|align="left"|23||align="left"|||align="left"| 
|||0||3||0||0||0||||0||1||0||
|-
|align="left"|24||align="left"|||align="left"|  ¤ 
|||0||1||0||||0||||0||1||0||
|-
|align="left"|25||align="left"|||align="left"| 
|||0||0||0||||0||style="background:#98FB98"|||0||2||0||
|-
|align="left"|26||align="left"|||style="background:#faecc8" align="left"|  ‡
|||0||||0||||1||style="background:#98FB98"|||0||3||0||
|-
|align="left"|27||align="left"|FW||align="left"| 
|||5||0||0||0||0||style="background:#98FB98"|||5||0||0||
|-
|align="left"|28||align="left"|||style="background:#faecc8" align="left"|  ‡
|0||0||0||0||||0||style="background:#98FB98"|||0||0||0||
|-
|align="left"|29||align="left"|FW||align="left"|  ¤
|||0||0||0||||0||||0||0||0||
|-
|align="left"|30||align="left"|||style="background:#faecc8" align="left"|  ‡
|||0||0||0||0||0||style="background:#98FB98"|||0||0||0||
|-
|align="left"|31||align="left"|||align="left"|  ¤
|0||0||0||0||0||0||0||0||0||0||
|-
|align="left"|32||align="left"|||align="left"| 
|0||0||0||0||0||0||0||0||0||0||
|-
|align="left"|33||align="left"|FW||align="left"|  †
|0||0||0||0||0||0||0||0||0||0||
|-
|align="left"|34||align="left"|||align="left"|  †
|0||0||0||0||0||0||0||0||0||0||
|-
|align="left"|35||align="left"|||align="left"| 
|0||0||0||0||0||0||0||0||0||0||
|-
|align="left"|36||align="left"|||align="left"| 
|0||0||0||0||0||0||0||0||0||0||
|-
|align="left"|37||align="left"|FW||align="left"|  ¤
|0||0||||0||||0||style="background:#98FB98"|||0||0||0||
|-
|align="left"|38||align="left"|||align="left"| 
|0||0||0||0||0||0||0||0||0||0||
|}

Awards

Transfers

In

Out

Loans in

Loans out

Kit
The season saw a new away kit, manufactured by Admiral, that was all black with minor gold trimmings. The home kit was the same as the previous season. Doritos sponsored the club for a second and final season.

References

2003–04 FA Premier League by team
2003-04